San Cristobal is a census-designated place in Taos County, New Mexico. Its population was 273 as of the 2010 census. San Cristobal has a post office with ZIP code 87564, which opened on February 16, 1932.

Geography

Demographics

In San Cristobal, New Mexico, the top 5 ethnic groups by percentage are White (Hispanic), White (Non-Hispanic), Other (Hispanic), American Indian & Alaska Native (Non-Hispanic), and Black or African American (Non-Hispanic).

Education
It is within Taos Municipal Schools, which operates Taos High School.

References

Census-designated places in New Mexico
Census-designated places in Taos County, New Mexico